Big Ben Aden is a clock tower built by British engineers, along with locals, beside Aden Harbour in Yemen during the period that Aden Province (later called Aden Colony) was a territory within the British Empire. It is superficially similar to the Elizabeth Tower (popularly known as Big Ben), the famous clock tower attached to the Palace of Westminster in London. The clock was shut down for renovation about a quarter of a century ago, and returned to service in February 2012. The tower was built during the 19th century as part of the British colonisation of Aden Province, which began in 1839 and came to an end in 1967.

History
The clock tower was built more than 130 years ago and was designed in accordance to Big Ben in London, being known as "Big Ben of the Arabs", or "Big Ben of the East". The project was completed in 1890 by British architects involved in the design and construction, with the assistance of local workers, made from a black stones and cement mix. The shape is rectangular and the roof is like an equilateral triangle covered with coated red brick. From inside it has an iron staircase with the tower directly looking towards the sea with a view of the Tawahi area.  

There is a replica of the Big Ben tower, but on a smaller scale, located in Crater at Arwa Street behind the National Bank of Yemen (infamously known in the mid-1960s as the Headquartered Fortress of Intelligence for the British Army during the Aden Emergency) and which is overlooked from the hill by the Aden Parliament Assembly building (a former Methodist Chapel converted to its current status in 1962).

References

Clock towers
Buildings and structures in Aden